Vonda Neel McIntyre was an American science fiction writer and biologist.

Early life and education 
Vonda N. McIntyre was born in Louisville, Kentucky, the daughter of H. Neel and Vonda B. Keith McIntyre, who were born in Poland, Ohio. She spent her early childhood on the east coast of the United States and in The Hague, Netherlands, and Poland, before her family settled in Seattle in the early 1960s.

In 1970, she earned a Bachelor of Science, with honors, in biology from the University of Washington. That same year, she attended the Clarion Writers Workshop. McIntyre went on to do graduate work at University of Washington in genetics.

Career 
In 1971, McIntyre founded the Clarion West Writers Workshop in Seattle, Washington, with the support of Clarion founder Robin Scott Wilson. She contributed to the workshop until 1973.

McIntyre won her first Nebula Award in 1973, for the novelette '"Of Mist, and Grass, and Sand". This later became part of the novel Dreamsnake (1978), which was rejected by the first editor who saw it, but went on to win both the Hugo and Nebula Awards. McIntyre became the third woman to receive the Hugo Award for Best Novel (1979).

McIntyre's debut novel, The Exile Waiting, was published in 1975. In 1976, McIntyre co-edited Aurora: Beyond Equality, a feminist/humanist science fiction anthology, with Susan Janice Anderson.

She also wrote a number of Star Trek and Star Wars novels, including Enterprise: The First Adventure and The Entropy Effect.  The Entropy Effect was the first original story published in the Pocket Books' series of Star Trek novels, and was developed by McIntyre from a screenplay that she wrote at age 18. It convinced Pocket Books to assign McIntyre the novelizations of the next three films Star Trek II: The Wrath of Khan, Star Trek III: The Search for Spock, and Star Trek IV: The Voyage Home. McIntyre created given names of several Star Trek characters that later became canon, including Hikaru Sulu, Nyota Uhura, and Kirk's mother Winona.  Sulu's given name became canon after Peter David, author of the comic book adaptation, visited the set of Star Trek VI: The Undiscovered Country, and convinced director Nicholas Meyer to insert the name into the film's script.

While taking part in a science fiction convention panel on sci-fi in TV, McIntyre became exasperated at a fellow panelist's extreme negativity toward existing science fiction TV shows. She asked the panel and audience if they had managed to see Starfarers, which she claimed was an amazing SF miniseries that had almost no viewers due to bad scheduling on the part of the network. No such show existed, but after reflecting on the plot she described, McIntyre felt it would make a good novel, and went on to write Starfarers as well as its three sequels, later referring to it as "my Best SF TV Series Never Made".

McIntyre's novel The Moon and the Sun, set in the court of Louis XIV of France, was rejected initially. In 1997, Pocket Books picked up the novel, and in 2013 Pandemonium Pictures began to produce The King's Daughter, featuring Pierce Brosnan as the Sun King. In October 2021, it was announced that Gravitas Ventures acquired distribution rights to the film, and set it for a January 21, 2022, release.

She was able to complete a final novel, Curve of the World, shortly before her death in 2019.

Personal life 
She enjoyed crafting crocheted marine creatures to contribute to the Hyperbolic Crochet Coral Reef project of the Institute For Figuring. 

McIntyre died on April 1, 2019, at her home in Seattle, Washington, of metastatic pancreatic cancer, which was diagnosed in February.

Legacy 
In 2019, Clarion West established the Vonda N. McIntyre Memorial Scholarship, to enable women writers and writers of color to attend the Clarion West Writers Workshop and Writing the Other established the Vonda N. McIntyre Sentient Squid Memorial Scholarship, to help authors at any point in their career path and from every background, including those who don't have the money to pay for writing workshops.

Awards and tributes 
 "Of Mist, and Grass, and Sand": 1974 Nebula Award, nominated for the 1974 Hugo Award and the 1974 Locus Poll Award
 Dreamsnake: 1979 Hugo Award, 1979 Nebula Award
 Robert A. Heinlein dedicated his 1982 novel Friday, "to Vonda" (among many others).
 The Moon and the Sun: 1998 Nebula Award, nominated for the 1998 Locus Poll Award and the 1997 James Tiptree, Jr. Award
 "Little Faces": Nominated for the 2005 James Tiptree, Jr. Award, 2006 Sturgeon Award, and the 2007 Nebula Award
 McIntyre was a Guest of Honor at Sasquan, the 73rd World Science Fiction Convention.

Bibliography

References

External links 
 Vonda N. McIntyre – Memorial website
 

1948 births
2019 deaths
20th-century American novelists
20th-century American women writers
21st-century American writers
21st-century American women writers
American science fiction writers
Hugo Award-winning writers
Star Trek fiction writers
Nebula Award winners
Women science fiction and fantasy writers
Writers from Seattle
American women novelists
Writers from Louisville, Kentucky
Novelists from Washington (state)
Novelists from Kentucky
Kentucky women writers
University of Washington alumni
Deaths from cancer in Washington (state)
Deaths from pancreatic cancer
People from Poland, Ohio